Manuel Jose Fernandez (born July 3, 1946) is a retired American football player who played eight seasons for the Miami Dolphins of the National Football League. He played in three consecutive Super Bowls for the Dolphins in the 1971, 1972, and 1973 seasons.

High school career
At San Lorenzo High School in San Lorenzo, California, he played football, wrestled, and threw the discus.

College career
Fernandez attended Chabot Junior College before enrolling at Utah under head coach Mike Giddings. Fernandez wore number 65 at Utah and was a three-year letterman.

Fernandez went undrafted and signed with the Dolphins.

NFL career 
Fernandez was a strong contender for MVP of Super Bowl VII. Wrote Nick Buoniconti, "It was the game of his life–in fact, it was the most dominant game by a defensive lineman in the history of the game, and he would never be given much credit for it. They should have given out two game balls and made Manny Fernandez the co-MVP with Jake Scott." Larry Csonka also said he thought Fernandez should have been the MVP. The MVP was selected by Dick Schaap, the editor of Sport magazine. Schaap admitted later that he had been out late the previous night, struggled to watch the defense-dominated game, and was not aware that Fernandez had 17 tackles. Fernandez also recorded a sack against the Washington Redskins' QB Billy Kilmer.

"Winning the car never entered my mind until I heard that Jake won it," Fernandez said in the January 1974 issue of Sport magazine. "I was happy for Jake, he played a helluva game for a guy who was healthy but he had two bad shoulders."

The following year, Fernandez recorded 5 tackles and 1 sack in Super Bowl VIII against the Minnesota Vikings. Two years earlier, Fernandez recorded 6 tackles, 1 sack and recovered a fumble in the Dolphins loss to the Dallas Cowboys. In his three Super Bowls Fernandez recorded three sacks and 28 tackles.

For his career Fernandez had 35 career sacks, a high number for a nose tackle, with a career high of 8 in 1971, which led the Dolphins. In Dolphin history only one nose tackle (Bob Baumhower: 39.5) recorded more sacks. Fernandez recorded 5.5 sacks in post-season play which is currently 3rd in Dolphins history behind defensive ends Kim Bokamper (8) and Trace Armstrong (6).

Fernandez was 2nd team All-Pro in 1970 and 1973, and an All-AFC selection in 1971 and a second-team All-AFC choice in 1972 and 1973, marking four consecutive season with post-season honors. Fernandez is also credited with being one of the first nose tackles in the NFL, since the Dolphins played the famed "53" defense (which was a 3–4 defense) in 1972 through 1974, which put Manny over the center. Likely, no team played the 3–4 defense more until the New England Patriots when went to the 3–4 full-time in 1974.

In 2007 was voted to the Dolphins All-Time team. Fernandez had previously been voted to the 1990 Dolphins Silver Anniversary Team that celebrated the Dolphins' 25 years in the NFL. From 1968 through 1973 Fernandez was voted as the Dolphins' "Outstanding Defensive Lineman", even though Pro Bowlers like Bill Stanfill and Vern Den Herder were on the same line.

In January 2001, Fernandez was named to Pro Football Weeklys All-Time Super Bowl team. In 2006, USA Today named him to their All-time Super Bowl team.

In 2013, President Barack Obama honored the entire 1972 Perfect Season Dolphins at an event in the White House, but Fernandez declined to attend. He told sports columnist Dave Hyde of Ft. Lauderdale's Sun-Sentinel "I'll just say my views are diametrically opposed to the President's... Enough said. Let's leave it at that. I hope everyone enjoys the trip who goes."

On December 21, 2014, Fernandez was inducted into the Miami Dolphin Honor Roll at Sun Life Stadium. On January 30, 2014, Frank Schwab from Yahoo! Sports ranked Manny Fernandez as the tenth-best player of all time in the past 48 Super Bowls.

References

External links
 

1946 births
Living people
American football defensive ends
American football defensive tackles
Miami Dolphins players
Utah Utes football players
People from San Lorenzo, California
Players of American football from Oakland, California
American sportspeople of Mexican descent